Book City may refer to:

Companies
Bookstore chains in several countries are named Book City:
Book City (Australia)
Book City (Canada)
Book City (China)
Book City (Iran)

Other uses
Leipzig, a German city nicknamed Buch-Stadt ("Book City") for its historically large publishing industry